Cannes – Mandelieu Airport or Aéroport de Cannes - Mandelieu  is an airport serving the city of Cannes. It is located 5 km west of Cannes and east of Mandelieu-la-Napoule, both communes of the Alpes-Maritimes département in the Provence-Alpes-Côte-d'Azur région of France.

Dominique Thillaud is the President of Aéroports de la Côte d'Azur (ACA), which includes Nice Côte d'Azur Airport and Cannes – Mandelieu Airport.

Aéroports de la Côte d'Azur (ACA) announced on July 26, 2013, it has acquired 99.9% of shares of AGST (Saint-Tropez Airport), previously owned by the Reybier group for the past 15 years.

Statistics

See also
Chantiers aéronavals Étienne Romano

References

External links 
 Aéroport Cannes Mandelieu (official site) 
 Aéroport de Cannes - Mandelieu (Union des Aéroports Français) 
 Cannes Mandelieu - LFMD - WikiAirports
 
 

Airports in Provence-Alpes-Côte d'Azur
Buildings and structures in Alpes-Maritimes